Centruroides robertoi is a species of scorpion in the family Buthidae.

Distribution 
Cuba

References

Buthidae
Animals described in 1976
Centruroides